Cryptospores are fossilised primitive plant spores that first appear in the fossil record during the middle of the Ordovician period.

Evidence that cryptospores derive from land plants

Occurrence
Cryptospores are generally found in non-marine rocks and decrease in abundance with distance offshore. This suggests that any cryptospores found in the marine environment were transported there by the wind from the land, rather than originating from the marine environment.

Wall ultrastructure
The walls of cryptospores consist of many lamellae (thin sheets). Liverworts, thought to be the most primitive land plants, also have this spore wall morphology.

Chemical composition 
(Some) cryptospores are composed of sporopollenin and have the same chemical makeup as co-occurring trilete spores.

Other information
Recently, fossils of plant sporangia have been found in Oman with cryptospores showing concentric lamellae in their walls, similar to liverworts. The earliest known cryptospores are from Middle Ordovician (Dapingian) strata of Argentina. Spores from the Lindegård Mudstone (late Katian–early Hirnantian) represent the earliest record of early land plant spores from Sweden and possibly also from Baltica and implies that land plants had migrated to the palaeocontinent Baltica by at least the Late Ordovician. This discovery reinforces the earlier suggestion that the migration of land plants from northern Gondwana to Baltica in the Late Ordovician was facilitated by the northward migration of Avalonia, which is evidenced by the co-occurrence of reworked, Early–Middle Ordovician acritarchs, possibly suggesting an Avalonian provenance in a foreland basin system.

See also
Paleobotany 
Palynology

References

Further reading
 

Fossil record of plants
Microfossils
Ordovician plants
Paleobotany
Paleozoic life
Palynology
Silurian life